Conditions of Faith is a 2000 novel by the Australian author Alex Miller.

Awards

Miles Franklin Award, 2001: shortlisted  
New South Wales Premier's Literary Awards, Christina Stead Prize for Fiction, 2001: winner

Reviews

"Australian Book Review" 
"Readings"  
"The Space ABC Arts Review" 

Novels by Alex Miller
2000 Australian novels
Novels set in Sydney
Novels set in France
Novels set in Tunisia